Pimenta Palace (Portuguese: Palácio Pimenta) is an 18th-century Portuguese palace located in Lisbon, Portugal, which hosts the main campus of the Museum of Lisbon.

History 
The palace was constructed by order of King John V of Portugal in the mid-18th century for his mistress Paula Teresa da Silva e Almeida, a nun of the Monastery of São Dinis in Odivelas, Portugal.

The Museum of Lisbon was installed in the palace on July 15, 1909, by approval of the Minister of Finances, Tomás António da Guarda Cabreira. Initially installed in City Hall, the museum passed through the Carmo Convent, Mitra Palace, and Galveias Palace until its complete installation in Pimenta Palace in 1979.

Sources 

Museum of Lisbon (In English)
Áreas de Actividade (In Portuguese)

Palaces in Lisbon
Museums in Lisbon